Bury Them Deep (also known as To the Last Drops of Blood) is a 1968 Italian Spaghetti Western film written and directed by Paolo Moffa  and starring Craig Hill.

Plot

Cast 

 Craig Hill as  Clive Norton
 Ettore Manni as   El Chaleco
 Ken Wood as   Billy Gunn 
 José Greci as   Consuelo/Pepita
  Francesco Santovetti as   Cordero
  Luciano Doria as  Colonel
  Alberto Bucchi as   Sheriff
  Antonio Danesi as  Gunns Leutnant

References

External links

English-language Italian films
Spaghetti Western films
1968 Western (genre) films
1968 films
Films directed by Paolo Moffa
Films scored by Nico Fidenco
1960s English-language films
1960s Italian films